William Jennings Bryan "Pat" Patterson (January 29, 1897 – October 1, 1977) was an American professional baseball player, a third baseman and shortstop who appeared in 23 games in Major League Baseball for the  New York Giants. His elder brother Ham also had a brief big-league career.

Pat Patterson's stint with the 1921 Giants came during the first two months of the season. He played sparingly until mid-June, going 2-for-5 in 15 brief appearances as a pinch hitter or defensive replacement. Then, between June 18–29, he started eight games in place of regular third baseman Frankie Frisch, a future Hall of Famer. In that span, Patterson had five multi-hit games, batted .400 (12 for 30), and slugged his lone big-league home run (off Lee Meadows of the Philadelphia Phillies). But when Frisch returned to the lineup, Patterson was sent to the Seattle Rainiers of the Pacific Coast League, and he never returned to the majors. The Giants went on to win the World Series that season.

Including his early-season appearances, Patterson posted a .400 lifetime batting average, with 14 hits in 35 at bats, as a major leaguer.

References

1897 births
1977 deaths
Baseball players from Illinois
Major League Baseball infielders
New York Giants (NL) players
Sherman Browns players
Oklahoma City Boosters players
Dallas Giants players
Houston Buffaloes players
Minneapolis Millers (baseball) players
Seattle Rainiers players
Denver Bears players
St. Joseph Drummers players
Sportspeople from Belleville, Illinois